DXSK (95.5 FM), broadcasting as 95.5 Cool FM, is a radio station owned and operated by Ranao Radio Broadcasting and TV System Corporation. The station's studio is located at Brgy. Raya Saduc, Marawi.

References

Radio stations established in 2001
Radio stations in Lanao del Sur